Xylinades is a genus of beetles from the family Anthribidae.

Species
 Xylinades acuticornis
 Xylinades adductus
 Xylinades affinis
 Xylinades alternans
 Xylinades andamanensis
 Xylinades annulipes
 Xylinades armatus
 Xylinades aruensis
 Xylinades aspericollis
 Xylinades atricornis
 Xylinades beesoni
 Xylinades carbo
 Xylinades compar
 Xylinades foveatus
 Xylinades funereus
 Xylinades furus
 Xylinades fustis
 Xylinades hopei
 Xylinades indignus
 Xylinades integer
 Xylinades japonicus
 Xylinades lanugicornis
 Xylinades lanuginosus
 Xylinades limbalis
 Xylinades maculipes
 Xylinades moles
 Xylinades moluccensis
 Xylinades montanus
 Xylinades moratus
 Xylinades nodicornis
 Xylinades ochripes
 Xylinades opulentus
 Xylinades parumsignatus
 Xylinades pertyi
 Xylinades philippinensis
 Xylinades phycus
 Xylinades plagiatus
 Xylinades princeps
 Xylinades roelofsi
 Xylinades rufopictus
 Xylinades rugiceps
 Xylinades rugicollis
 Xylinades rugosus
 Xylinades simillimus
 Xylinades singularis
 Xylinades sinuaticollis
 Xylinades striatifrons
 Xylinades sulcifrons
 Xylinades tamilanus
 Xylinades tardus
 Xylinades thomasius
 Xylinades tuberculosus
 Xylinades westermanni
 Xylinades whiteheadi
 Xylinades vicinus

References 

 Catalogue of Life

Anthribidae
Weevil genera